Louise Cripps Samoiloff (13 December 1904 – 21 September 2001) was a British-born writer, journalist, historian and editor who became an American citizen and wrote several books advocating the case for the independence of Puerto Rico.

Biography

Louise Cripps studied journalism at University College London during the mid-1920s and aimed to become a literary writer, though found work in London as a journalist and editor working for various publications including Nursery World and British Vogue.  Politically radicalising during the Great Depression and the rise of fascism in Europe, she became a Marxist in the early 1930s, joining the tiny British Trotskyist movement and working in the Marxist Group.  During the Second World War, she moved to New York and worked for the British War Relief Society, editing a publication Salute: a tribute to courage for British War Relief, and published her first book Your first baby! (1943).  After the war she continued to work as a journalist and publisher, editing an American publication Baby Post.  In the 1960s she moved to Puerto Rico for her retirement where she wrote many books about the island and putting the case for independence, as well as other works of history and a novel, Lirazel.

Over the course of her life, Louise Cripps knew many key intellectual figures of the twentieth century including C.L.R. James (with whom she had a relationship during the 1930s), Bertrand Russell, John Dewey, George Grosz, Dr. Benjamin Spock, Harold Laski, Gordon K. Lewis, Norman Thomas, G.K. Chesterton, Havelock Ellis, Izrael Hieger and Earle Birney.  Her first marriage was to the writer Bernard Glemser, whom she married in early 1932 and with whom she had one son, Martin, before marrying Leon A. Samoiloff, a Russian-born Harvard-educated man in 1946.

Publications
Books

Further reading
Hogsbjerg, Christian. Louise Cripps Samoiloff: a life seeking justice in all its colours (London: Redwords, 2022): ISBN 978191413878 
Williams, John, L. C.L.R. James: A Life Beyond the Boundaries (London: Constable, 2022).

References

1904 births
2001 deaths
20th-century British women writers
20th-century British non-fiction writers